Edward Hyde Villiers, 5th Earl of Clarendon,  (11 February 1846 – 2 October 1914), styled Lord Hyde between 1846 and 1870, was a British Liberal Unionist politician from the Villiers family. He served as Lord Chamberlain of the Household between 1900 and 1905.

Background and education
Clarendon was the second but eldest surviving son of the prominent Liberal statesman George Villiers, 4th Earl of Clarendon and his wife Lady Katherine Grimston, daughter of James Grimston, 1st Earl of Verulam. He was educated at Harrow and Trinity College, Cambridge.

Political career

Clarendon was elected to Parliament for Brecon in 1869, a seat he retained until the following year, when he succeeded his father in the earldom and took his seat in the House of Lords. In 1895 he was appointed a Lord-in-waiting in the Unionist administration of Lord Salisbury, a position he held until 1900, when he was promoted to Lord Chamberlain of the Household and admitted to the Privy Council. He retained this office also when Arthur Balfour became Prime Minister in 1902. The government fell in December 1905 and Clarendon was never to return to office.

Apart from his political career Lord Clarendon joined the Hertfordshire Yeomanry as a Troop Quartermaster in 1868, and was commissioned as a Cornet the following year. He  was promoted captain in 1872 and to command the regiment in 1879 with the rank of lieutenant-colonel. He was the regiment's longest-serving commanding officer, continuing in the position until 1901 and afterwards becoming its Honorary Colonel in 1908. He was also Lord-Lieutenant of Hertfordshire from 1893 to 1914.

Sporting career
Clarendon made one known appearance in first-class cricket for Cambridge University in 1865. He was a right-handed batsman and a roundarm fast bowler. Four of his uncles James, Edward, Robert and Francis Grimston all played first-class cricket, as did his cousin Walter Grimston. Between 1890 and 1896, Lord Clarendon was a member of the Football Committee at West Hertfordshire Sports Club, chairing some of the meetings. During this period the club won three Herts Senior Cups in four years, not entering it in the other year. This football team was later to become known as Watford Football Club.

Family
Lord Clarendon married firstly, Lady Caroline Agar, daughter of James Agar, 3rd Earl of Normanton, on 6 September 1876. After his first wife's death in 1894 he married secondly, Emma Hatch, on 5 August 1908. By his first marriage he had two children:

 George Herbert Hyde Villiers, 6th Earl of Clarendon (1877–1955)
 Lady Edith Villiers (1878–1935), married Piers Edgcumbe, 5th Earl of Mount Edgcumbe

Lord Clarendon died in October 1914, aged 68, and was succeeded in the earldom by his only son George.

Artistic recognition

He was sculpted by Mary Pownall c.1900.

Honours
British honours
GCB :  Knight Grand Cross of the Order of the Bath – 24 October 1902 – announced in the 1902 Coronation Honours list on 26 June 1902, invested by King Edward VII at Buckingham Palace on 24 October 1902.
GCVO: Knight Grand Cross of the Royal Victorian Order in 1905
TD: Territorial Decoration 
Foreign honours
: Knight 1st class of the Order of the Red Eagle – 1899 – in connection with the visit of Emperor Wilhelm II to the United Kingdom.

References

External links

1846 births
1914 deaths
People educated at Harrow School
Alumni of Trinity College, Cambridge
English cricketers of 1826 to 1863
Cambridge University cricketers
Hyde, Edward Villiers, Lord
Baronesses- and Lords-in-Waiting
Deputy Lieutenants of Warwickshire
5
Lord-Lieutenants of Hertfordshire
Hertfordshire Yeomanry officers
Members of the Privy Council of the United Kingdom
Liberal Party (UK) hereditary peers
Liberal Unionist Party peers
Edward Villiers, 5th Earl of Clarendon
Hyde, Edward Villiers, Lord
Clarendon, E5
Watford F.C. directors
Presidents of the Marylebone Cricket Club
Knights Grand Cross of the Order of the Bath
Knights Grand Cross of the Royal Victorian Order